Albert Edward Kennedy (12 June 1886 – 17 May 1960) was an Australian rules footballer who played for the Essendon Football Club in the Victorian Football League (VFL).

Notes

External links 
		

1886 births
1960 deaths
Australian rules footballers from Victoria (Australia)
Essendon Football Club players